Maureen Anne Kaila Vergara (born December 17, 1964) is a retired Salvadoran cycle racer who rode for the 800.com team. Her career began in 1990 and ended in 2001. Vergara competed in the road race in the Summer Olympic Games in 1996 and 2000.

Notes

References

External links
 
 
 
 

1964 births
Living people
Salvadoran female cyclists
Olympic cyclists of El Salvador
Cyclists at the 1996 Summer Olympics
Cyclists at the 2000 Summer Olympics
Central American and Caribbean Games medalists in cycling
Central American and Caribbean Games bronze medalists for El Salvador
Competitors at the 1998 Central American and Caribbean Games